Gesneria calycina is a species of plant in the family Gesneriaceae. It is endemic to Jamaica.

References

calycina
Near threatened plants
Endemic flora of Jamaica
Taxonomy articles created by Polbot
Plants described in 1788
Taxa named by Olof Swartz